Colorado C.I. is a 1978 American made-for-television crime drama mystery film and was intended as a pilot for a series. The teleplay was written by Robert W. Lenski and the film directed by Virgil W. Vogel, with Christopher Morgan as the producer and Philip Saltzman as the Executive Producer. The film was broadcast on CBS on May 26, 1978.

Mark Gunnison (John Elerick) and Pete Gunnison (Marshall Colt) are brothers and undercover detectives of the elite Criminal Investigation Unit of the Colorado Police. The cast also included L.Q. Jones, Christine Belford, Van Williams, Laurette Sprang, David Hedison, William Lucking, Christine De Lisle, Randolph Powell, Lou Frizzell, John Karlen, George D. Wallace, Joan Roberts and Ann Bradley.

The film ran for 60 minutes in color with mono sound.

Sources

External links

1978 television films
1978 films
Films set in Colorado
Films shot in Colorado
CBS network films
1970s English-language films
Films directed by Virgil W. Vogel